Scorchy is a 1976 American crime film written and directed by Howard Avedis, and starring Connie Stevens, Cesare Danova, William Smith, Norman Burton, John Davis Chandler and Joyce Jameson. It was released on October 8, 1976 by American International Pictures.

Plot
Jackie Parker is a federal narcotics agent based in Seattle who goes undercover to investigate Philip Bianco, a drug dealer.

Cast 
Connie Stevens as Jackie Parker
Cesare Danova as Philip Bianco
William Smith as Carl Henrich
Norman Burton as Chief Frank O'Brien 
John Davis Chandler as Nicky 
Joyce Jameson as Mary Davis
Greg Evigan as Alan
Nick Dimitri as Steve
Nate Long as Charlie
Ingrid Cedergren as Suzi
Ellen Thurston as Maria
Ray Sebastian as Counterman
Mike Esky as Dimitri
Gene White as Big Boy
Marlene Schmidt as Claudia Bianco

References

External links
 
 
 Scorchy on Blu-ray

1976 films
American crime films
1976 crime films
Films set in Seattle
American International Pictures films
American independent films
1976 independent films
1970s English-language films
1970s American films